Yanghwajin Foreign Missionary Cemetery, also known as the Hapjeong-dong International Cemetery, is a cemetery overlooking the Han River in the district of Mapo-gu, Seoul, South Korea. Designated in 1890 as a site for foreign missionaries by King Gojong, the site is currently open to the public from 9:00am to 6:00pm and is located next to Jeoldusan Martyr's Shrine. It is estimated that approximately 30,000 Koreans and 500 foreign nationals visit every year.

History
The death of Presbyterian minister John Heron in July 1890 prompted the small but growing international community in Seoul to look for a proper location for burials. Previous burials were conducted in modern-day Incheon at the Chemulpo Foreigners' Cemetery.

Dr. Horace Allen obtained the land rights of the bluff overlooking the Han River and called it Yanghwajin; so named for an old ferry crossing that once existed nearby. The site for the cemetery already had historical significance: in 1839, a number of French Catholic missionaries were put to death there and in 1866, a number of Korean Catholics were also killed in a mass execution on the nearby riverbank.

The cemetery was also a victim of close quarters combat during the Korean War and war damage to many of the grave markers is quite evident. Attempts to repair the fractured markers are minimal at the request of community members.

Originally officially maintained by members of the Kyungsung European-American Cemetery Association the 14,000 square meter (4000 Pyeong) grounds have been unofficially taken care by foreign diplomats, businesspeople, volunteer groundskeepers and missionaries since its founding.

Controversies
Originally built for the members of the foreign missionary community in Seoul, the Kyungsung European-American Cemetery Association maintained the grounds until a 1961 decree by President Park Chung-hee stating that foreigners were not allowed to own land. The grounds technically belonged to no one until the city of Seoul designated it a public park in 1965. In 1968, when the South Korean government passed a law requiring foreigners to register all land, the cemetery was curiously never officially registered. In 1985, a committee called the Council for the 100th Anniversary of the Korean Church was asked by Horace Grant Underwood III to register the cemetery on behalf of the Seoul Union Church with the understanding that the Seoul Union Church would be the unofficial caretakers. The committee agreed and a year later built a joint-use chapel nearby called the Memorial Chapel.

In 2005, the predominantly international congregation of the Seoul Union Church began sharing the Memorial Chapel with a Korean congregation composed of the former 100th Anniversary Memorial Church Committee. The two congregations coexisted amicably until the death of Dr. Horace Grant Underwood III in 2004. However, the two congregations then began to disagree about proper caretaking responsibilities as well as who officially takes care of the grounds. On August 5, 2007, the Seoul Union Church was officially removed from the grounds including the chapel. The church, cemetery and adjacent museum are since the property of the Memorial Church.

Conflicting reports from the Memorial Church further claim that some interments would be disinterred in the future Memorial church leader Lee Jae-chul referred to the change in cemetery caretakership similar to the "Chinese retaking Hong Kong".

Statistics

*These figures do not include the 23 known unmarked graves or the unknown number of Korean children from the Anglican orphanages buried on upper slope of the Anglican plot.

Notable interments

 Homer Hulbert (1863–1949) American missionary and journalist whose headstone proclaims "I would rather be buried in Korea than in Westminster Abbey."
 Ernest Bethell (1872–1909) founder of Daehan Maeil Sinbo who died after being imprisoned by the Japanese army for exposing abuses against Korean civilians. Years after soldiers erased a defiant challenge to the Imperial Army on Bethell's grave marker, the words were replaced by officials from the Seoul Union Church.
 Horace Grant Underwood (1859–1916) founder of the Seoul YMCA, Saemunan Presbyterian Church and what eventually became Yonsei University
 Henry Gerhard Appenzeller (1858–1902) (cenotaph) who greatly contributed to the foundation of Pai Chai University
 Douglas B. Avison (1893–1952) who was a founder of Severance Hospital.
 Rosetta Sherwood Hall (1865–1951), medical missionary and founder of Pyongyang School for the Deaf and Blind, Baldwin Dispensary(Lilian Harris Memorial Hospital). Instrumental in founding of Hall Memorial Hospital (Pyongyang).
 Sherwood Hall, (1893–1991), medical missionary to Korea and India, founder of Haeju School for the Tuberculous, founder of Korea Christmas Seals (1932), recipient of the Order of Civil Merit, Moran Medal(1984)
 William James Hall, (1860-1894), medical missionary and namesake of Hall Memorial Hospital (Pyongyang).
 Clarence Ridgley Greathouse (1843–1899) supervisor to 1895 trial of the murder of Queen Min
 Brevet Brigadier General Charles W. Le Gendre (1830–1899) French-born American general, diplomat and advisor to King Kojong from 1890 to 1899.
 Albert Wilder "Bruce" Taylor (1875–1948) American gold mining executive and UPA (later UPI) correspondent, lived in Korea for the majority of his life with his wife, Mary Linley Taylor. He was actively involved in the Korean independence movement and infamously photographed King Kojong's funeral procession.

References

External links
 Homepage 
 Seoul Foreigner's Cemetery
 Marmot's Hole: The Forgotten Americans at Yanghwajin
 

Buildings and structures in Seoul
Cemeteries in South Korea
Christian missionaries in Korea
History of Korea
1890s establishments in Korea
19th-century architecture in Korea